Thomas Baskerville may refer to:

Thomas Baskerville (died 1572), MP for Worcestershire
Thomas Baskerville (general) (died 1597), MP for Carmarthen Boroughs
Thomas Baskerville (topographer) (1630–1720), English topographer
Thomas Baskerville (botanist) (1812–1840), English botanical writer
Thomas Baskerville Mynors Baskerville, British politician

See also
Baskerville (surname)